The Caproni Ca.90 was a prototype Italian heavy bomber designed and built by Caproni. When it first flew in 1929 it was the largest land-based aircraft in the world.

Design and development
A six-engined inverted sesquiplane, the Caproni Ca.90 was designed as a heavy bomber and first flew in 1929. It had two tandem pairs of  Isotta Fraschini Asso 1000 W-18 piston engines mounted above the lower wing, each pair driving a four-bladed pusher and a two-bladed tractor propeller. Another pair of engines was mounted above the fuselage. Only one Ca.90 was built.

Although the Dornier Do X flying boat that flew later in 1929 had a larger wingspan and weight, the Caproni Ca.90 remained the largest landplane until the arrival of the Tupolev ANT-20 in 1934.

Specifications

Appearances in media
The Ca.90 appeared in animated form, within the Studio Ghibli film, Kaze Tachinu. 
It makes its appearance in a dream sequence where Jiro Horikoshi has a meaningful meeting and conversation with his inspiration, Count Caproni.

See also
Beardmore Inflexible

References

Notes

Bibliography

 Angelucci, Enzo. The Rand McNally Encyclopedia of Military Aircraft, 1914-1980. San Diego, California: The Military Press, 1983. .
 The Illustrated Encyclopedia of Aircraft (Part Work 1982-1985). London: Orbis Publishing, 1985.

Ca.090
1920s Italian bomber aircraft
Biplanes with negative stagger
Six-engined push-pull aircraft